Belisario Domínguez Palencia (April 25, 1863 in Comitán, Chiapas – October 7, 1913 in Mexico City) was a Mexican physician and liberal politician. He served as senator and gave a memorable speech in the Congress during the Mexican Revolution against the dictator Victoriano Huerta, for which he was murdered.

Biography
Domínguez was born to Cleofas Domínguez and María del Pilar Palencia. His grandfather, Don Quirino Domínguez y Ulloa, had been vice-governor of Chiapas.

He attended a colegio in San Cristóbal de las Casas, Chiapas.  In 1879 he went to Paris where he studied medicine; he lived in Paris for 10 years. In 1889 he returned to Mexico and in 1890 he married Delina Zebadúa, with whom he had four children.  His wife died young.

In 1909, he was elected mayor of Comitán. In 1912, Leopoldo Gout and he ran for a seat in the Senate (Domínguez as substitute senator); when Gout died, Domínguez replaced him.  In 1913 he gave a speech in Congress against the dictator Victoriano Huerta and as a result he was murdered in Mexico City by Gilberto Márquez, Alberto Quiroz, José Hernández Ramírez, Gabriel Huerta.

The Senate's Belisario Domínguez Medal of Honor and Belisario Domínguez Dam are named after him. His home town was also renamed Comitán de Domínguez in 1915 in his memory.

References

Members of the Senate of the Republic (Mexico)
Mayors of places in Mexico
Assassinated Mexican politicians
Politicians from Chiapas
20th-century Mexican physicians
1863 births
1913 deaths
Mexican democracy activists
People of the Mexican Revolution
People murdered in Mexico
People from Comitán
19th-century Mexican physicians
20th-century Mexican politicians